Rudinilson Gomes Brito Silva (born 20 August 1994) is a Bissau-Guinean professional footballer who plays as a defender for KTP.

Club career
On 18 September 2013, Rudinilson made his professional debut with Benfica B in a 2013–14 Segunda Liga match against Aves.

On 22 August 2014, he joined Lechia Gdańsk in Poland.

On 22 February 2017, Rudinilson signed a two-year deal with Lithuanian A Lyga club FK Utenis Utena. In August that year, he moved to Moroccan side OC Khouribga.

In early 2019, Rudinilson returned to Lithuania and signed with FK Kauno Žalgiris.

On 1 February 2022, he moved back to Poland and joined I liga side Wigry Suwałki until the end of the season, with an extension option.

On 21 July 2022, he joined Finnish club KTP.

International career
Having previously represented Portugal at multiple youth levels, Rudinilson made his senior international debut for Guinea-Bissau on 19 July 2014.

References

External links
 
 Stats and profile at LPFP
 
 
 

1994 births
Living people
Sportspeople from Bissau
Portuguese footballers
Portugal youth international footballers
Bissau-Guinean footballers
Portuguese people of Bissau-Guinean descent
Guinea-Bissau international footballers
Association football defenders
S.L. Benfica B players
Liga Portugal 2 players
A Lyga players
Botola players
Lechia Gdańsk players
Lechia Gdańsk II players
Ekstraklasa players
FK Utenis Utena players
Olympique Club de Khouribga players
FK Kauno Žalgiris players
Wigry Suwałki players
Kotkan Työväen Palloilijat players
Bissau-Guinean expatriate footballers
Bissau-Guinean emigrants to Portugal
Bissau-Guinean expatriate sportspeople in Poland
Bissau-Guinean expatriate sportspeople in Lithuania
Bissau-Guinean expatriate sportspeople in Morocco
Bissau-Guinean expatriate sportspeople in Finland
Expatriate footballers in Poland
Expatriate footballers in Lithuania
Expatriate footballers in Morocco
Expatriate footballers in Finland
2017 Africa Cup of Nations players
2019 Africa Cup of Nations players